is a former Japanese football player.

Playing career
Kawamoto was born in Kanagawa Prefecture on June 21, 1971. After graduating from Tokai University, he joined the Japan Football League club Fujitsu (later Kawasaki Frontale) in 1994. He became a regular player as center back from the first season. However, hr did not play as much in 1995. In 1998, he became a regular player again and the club won second place and was promoted to the new J2 League in 1999. The club won the championship for the 1999 season and was promoted to the J1 League for the 2000 season. However, he did not play as much in 1999 and he left the club at the end of the 1999 season without playing J1.

Club statistics

References

External links

Kawasaki Frontale in 1999

1971 births
Living people
Tokai University alumni
Association football people from Kanagawa Prefecture
Japanese footballers
J2 League players
Japan Football League (1992–1998) players
Kawasaki Frontale players
Association football defenders